The Byron Bay Bluesfest, formerly the East Coast International Blues & Roots Music Festival, is an annual Australian music festival that has been held over the Easter long weekend in the Byron Bay, New South Wales, area since 1990. The festival features a large selection of blues and roots performers from Australia and around the world and is one of the world's leading contemporary music festivals.

The festival was founded by Dan Doeppel and Kevin Oxford in 1990 and is run by Peter Noble who joined Oxford for the 1994 event. Originally running for four days, it now runs for five days, from Thursday to Monday.

The Boomerang Festival is an event within the festival dedicated to Indigenous Australian performance, art and culture.

Bluesfest 2020 and 2021 were cancelled due to the COVID-19 pandemic in Australia.

History
The festival began in 1990 at the Arts Factory in Byron Bay as a four-day blues music event over the Easter weekend. It was founded by Dan Doeppel and Kevin Oxford in 1990 and is now run by Peter Noble who joined Oxford for the 1994 event.

It has been held at several locations in and around Byron Bay and is currently held at Tyagarah, 11 kilometres drive north of Byron Bay town. It now runs for five days, from Thursday to Monday. From an original crowd of 6,000, it now attracts annual audiences of over 101,000 across the five days. Patrons range from locals to international visitors from a wide age range, including celebrities such as Matt Damon, Jason Momoa and Chris Hemsworth.

In December 2004, Keven Oxford, a director and founder of the event, left the festival and sold his 50% share of the company to a consortium comprising Michael Chugg (managing director of Sydney-based Michael Chugg Entertainment), Daryl Herbert (CEO of Melbourne-based Definitive Events) and Glenn Wheatley (CEO of Melbourne-based Talentworks), who ran the festival with co-founder Peter Noble. Noble bought out the consortium in 2008 and now owns the festival alone. In 2010 Bluesfest moved to its permanent home at the 120-hectare Tyagarah Tea Tree farm.

In 2014 the Boomerang Festival was introduced as part of Bluesfest. This is an event within the festival dedicated to Indigenous Australian performance, art and culture.

2020 
Bluesfest 2020 was the first of 31 Bluesfests to be cancelled, due to event restrictions imposed when the COVID-19 pandemic in Australia occurred.

2021 
The 2021 event, scheduled for 1–5 April, was cancelled one day before it was to commence after a COVID-19 case was detected in Byron Bay. A public health order to shut down the music festival was signed by the Minister for Health Brad Hazzard. As of 17 February the festival was still going ahead as the NSW Government had  approved its COVID safety plan. It was to have been about half the size of previous Bluesfests, and  be fully seated. Only Australian artists were to play.  Evelyn Richardson, of  live performance industry body Live Performance Australia, estimated the sudden cancellation had caused an  loss. Eddie Brook of the Cape Byron Distillery said that Bluesfest was worth A$100 million to the local economy.

Another event was arranged for October 2021, but on 17 August it was cancelled.

2022 
The 2022 Bluesfest took place on 15–19 April.

2023 
In November 2022 it was announced that, in addition to the 34th annual Byron Bay Festival being held on 6–10 April 2023, the inaugural Bluesfest Melbourne will take place on 8–9 April. Controversy about the line-up erupted after controversial band Sticky Fingers was included in the line-up. This resulted in Melbourne band King Gizzard & the Lizard Wizard and rapper Sampa the Great withdrawing from the festival in protest. Bluesfest director, Peter Noble, defended the decision to include the band stating that the lead singer of Sticky Fingers had apologized for his past actions and called for the artists to stop living in the past. After weeks of backlash, it was announced that Sticky Fingers would no longer be on the lineup.

Awards

Awards summary – Bluesfest 
1 win at the Keeping the Blues Alive Awards Memphis - For Festival Director Peter Noble
8 wins at the NSW Tourism Awards for Major Festivals & Events (6 Gold, 2 Silver)
6 wins at the North Coast Tourism Awards for Major Festivals & Events
4 wins at the Helpmann Awards for Best Contemporary Music Festival, Ceremony for Australia's most talented and celebrated performers and industry
6 wins at the Australian Event Awards for Australian Event of the Year
10 nominations at the Pollstar Awards (US) for International Festival of the Year (6 in a row from 2012- incl 2017)
1 nomination at the Pollstar Awards (US) for International Festival of the Decade 

Bluesfest Awards
2022   Gold Major Festivals & Events, NSW Tourism Award
2019   Best Regional Event, Australian Event Awards 
2018   Best Cultural, Arts or Music Event - Australian Event Awards  
2018   Keeping the Blues Alive Award Memphis - For Festival Director Peter Noble
2017   Gold Major Festivals & Events - NSW Tourism Awards (After winning Gold 3rd time in a row Bluesfest entered the NSW Tourism Hall of Fame) 
2017   Best Regional Event, Australian Event Awards 
2016   Gold Major Festival & Events, NSW Tourism Awards 
2016   Best Regional Event, Australian Event Awards  
2016   Gold Major Festivals & Events, North Coast Tourism Awards
2016   Order of Australia Medal (OAM), Won by Festival Director, Peter Noble ‘For service to live and recorded music, to  tourism, and to the community.’
2015   Gold Major Festivals & Events, NSW Tourism Awards
2015   Gold Major Festivals & Events, North Coast Tourism Awards
2015   Pan Australasian Festival Of The Year, Canadian Music Week International Festival Awards
2014 	Best Contemporary Music Festival, Australian Helpmann Awards
2014   Best Cultural, Arts or Music Event, Australian Event Award
2014 	Gold Major Festival & Event, North Coast Tourism Awards 
2014 	'The Rolling Stone Award' Won by Festival Director, Peter Noble
2014 	Silver Major Festivals & Events, NSW Tourism Awards
2013 	Silver Best Cultural, Arts or Music Event  Australian Event Awards  
2013 	Gold Major Festivals & Events, NSW Tourism Awards
2013 	Gold Major Festivals & Events, North Coast Tourism Awards
2013 	Best Regional Event, Australian Event Awards
2013 	Best Contemporary Music Festival Australian Helpmann Awards
2013 	Business Excellence Award, North Coast Tourism Awards
2012/13 The International A Greener Festival Award
2012 	Silver Major Festival & Events, NSW Tourism Awards
2012 	Business Excellence Award, North Coast Tourism Awards  
2011 	The International A Greener Festival Award
2011 	Gold Major Festivals & Events, NSW Tourism Awards
2011 	Business Excellence Award, North Coast Tourism Awards  
2010 	Australian Event of the Year, Australian Event Awards
2010 	The International A Greener Festival Award 
2009 	The International A Greener Festival Award 
2008	Grammy Award, ‘Best Zydeco Or Cajun Music Album’, Terrance Simien & The Zydeco Experience (AIM Records artist)
2008 	The International A Greener Festival Award  
2007 	The International A Greener Festival Award 
2006 	Best Contemporary Music Festival, Australian Helpmann Awards
2005 	Best Contemporary Music Festival, Australian Helpmann Awards
1998 – 2013 Readers Poll Award, Rhythms Magazine – "Best Australian Festival" 
1994 -96 Readers Poll Award, Rhythms Magazine – "Best Australian Festival"

Bluesfest nominations
2022   Pollstar Awards (USA) for International Festival of the Year
2022   Best Cultural/Arts Event, Australian Event Awards
2021   Pollstar Awards (USA) for International Festival of the Decade  
2019   Pollstar Awards (USA) for International Festival of the Year 
2017   Best Contemporary Music Festival, Australian Helpmann Awards
2016   International Music Festival of the Year, 28th Pollstar Awards (2017)
2016   Best Contemporary Music Festival, Australian Helpmann Awards
2015   International Music Festival of the Year, 27th Pollstar Awards (2016)
2015   Best Contemporary Music Festival Australian Helpmann Awards
2014 	Major Festivals & Events, NSW Tourism Awards 
2014 	Best Cultural, Arts or Music Event, Australian Event Awards 
2014 	Best Tourism Event, Australian Event Awards 
2014 	Best Regional Event, Australian Event Awards 
2014 	Best New Event for Boomerang Festival, Australian Event Awards 
2013 	International Festival of the Year 25th Pollstar Awards (2014)
2013 	Best Tourism Event, Australian Event Awards
2012 	International Festival of the Year 24th Pollstar Awards (2013)
2012 	Best Cultural/Arts Event, Australian Event Awards
2012 	Best Contemporary Music Festival, Robert Helpmann Awards
2011 	Best Regional Event, Australian Event Awards 
2011 	Best Achievement in Sustainability, Australian Event Awards 
2009 	Best Cultural or Arts Event, Australian Event Awards 
2009 	Best Overseas Festival, UK Festival Awards 
2008	Grammy Award, ‘Best Tropical Latin Album’, Greetings From Havana - Cubanismo (AIM Records artist)
2008 	Best Contemporary Music Festival, Australian Helpmann Awards
2007 	International Music Festival of the Year from the esteemed US based Pollstar Concert Industry Awards

Line-up 2007
The line-up for the 2007 festival included:

Rodriguez (US)
Ben Harper and the Innocent Criminals (US)
John Mayer (US)
Missy Higgins
Wolfmother
Bela Fleck and the Flecktones (US)
Bonnie Raitt (US)
Bo Diddley (US)
Taj Mahal (US)
Tony Joe White (US)
The Roots (US)
Kasey Chambers
John Butler Trio
Fat Freddys Drop (NZ)
Sierra Leone's Refugee All Stars (Sierra Leone)
Fishbone (USA)
Gomez (UK)
Fred Eaglesmith (CAN)
Kieran Kane and Kevin Welch with Fats Kaplin (US)
Feist (Canada)
The Waifs
Ben Kweller (US)
Flogging Molly (US)
Xavier Rudd
The NEO
Pappa Jam

Line-up 2008
The 2008 festival was held at the  Belongil Fields, the original outdoor venue. The 2008 festival had more food and craft stalls, a covered area where festival goers could eat at tables, a chill-out area, plus an area for an additional, fifth stage.

Artists in 2008 included Buddy Guy, Eskimo Joe, The John Butler Trio, Gotye, The Beautiful Girls, Newton Faulkner, Seasick Steve, Charlie Musselwhite, Mavis Staples, John P. Hammond, John Hiatt, Ray Davies, Maceo Parker, Loudon Wainwright III, Ozomatli, Ruthie Foster, Jake Shimabukuro, Keith Urban, Amali Ward, Lior, MOFRO, Dan Sultan, Jeff Lang, The Cat Empire, Clare Bowditch, Raul Midon and Xavier Rudd.

Line-up 2011
The line-up for the 2011 festival included:

Bob Dylan
B. B. King
Grace Jones
Ben Harper and Relentless7
Elvis Costello and the Imposters
Leon Russell
George Clinton and Parliament-Funkadelic
Jethro Tull
ZZ Top
John Legend
Michael Franti and Spearhead
Gurrumul
Toots and the Maytals
Luciano and Jah Messenjah Band
Blind Boys of Alabama featuring Aaron Neville
Paul Kelly
Buffy Sainte-Marie
Warren Haynes and his Allstar Band
Rodrigo y Gabriela
Fistful of Mercy
Derek Trucks and Susan Tedeschi Band
Imogen Heap
Ernest Ranglin
Robert Randolph and the Family Band
The Cat Empire
Mavis Staples
Kasey Chambers
Clare Bowditch
Little Feat
Indigo Girls
Osibisa
Tim Finn
Raúl Malo
Wolfmother
Xavier Rudd
Funky Meters
Trombone Shorty and Orleans Avenue
Irma Thomas
Fishbone
Los Lobos
Trinity Roots
Kate Miller-Heidke
Michelle Shocked
Jeff Lang
Saltwater Band
Washington
Jack Thompson and the Original Sinner
Peter Rowan Bluegrass Band
Neil Murray
Ash Grunwald
Eli "Paperboy" Reed
C. W. Stoneking
Tim Robbins and the Rogues Gallery Band
Eric Bibb
Ruthie Foster
Tony Joe White
Joe Louis Walker
Frank Yamma
The Bamboos
The Aggrolites
Resin Dogs
Yodelice
Shane Nicholson
Lisa Miller
The Dingoes
Leah Flanagan
Bobby Long
Lowrider
Dale Watson and His Lone Stars
Barrence Whitfield
The Blackwater Fever
Phil Jones and the Unknown Blues

Line-up 2012
The line-up for the 2012 festival included:

Cold Chisel
John Fogerty performing the songs of Creedence Clearwater Revival
Crosby, Stills & Nash
Earth, Wind & Fire
The Pogues
The Specials
John Butler Trio
My Morning Jacket
Yes
Buddy Guy
Donovan
Lucinda Williams
Maceo Parker
G3 featuring Joe Satriani, Steve Vai and Steve Lukather
Ziggy Marley
Brian Setzer's Rockabilly Riot!
John Hiatt & the Combo
Angelique Kidjo
Sublime with Rome
Zappa Plays Zappa
Slightly Stoopid
Jonny Lang
Seasick Steve
Kenny Wayne Shepherd
Keb' Mo'
Candi Staton
Nick Lowe
Steve Earle
Justin Townes Earle
Yann Tiersen
Josh Pyke
Bettye LaVette
Rosie Ledet
Trombone Shorty & Orleans Avenue
Weddings Parties Anything
Great Big Sea
Seth Lakeman
Blue King Brown
The Fabulous Thunderbirds featuring Kim Wilson
David Bromberg Quartet
Canned Heat
Melbourne Ska Orchestra
Alabama 3
Dawes
Vusi Mahlasela
Backsliders
Richard Clapton
Blitzen Trapper
The Audreys
Eugene Bridges
Ray Beadle
James Vincent McMorrow
Eilen Jewell
1814
Joanne Shaw Taylor
Hat Fitz & Cara
Harry Manx
Tribali
Watussi
Eagle and the Worm
Mick Thomas' Roving Commission
Mat McHugh (The Beautiful Girls)
The Hands
Mama Kin
Tijuana Cartel
Busby Marou
Benjalu
Bobby Alu
Dan Hannaford
Carus Thompson
Daniel Champagne
Dubmarine
Kim Churchill
Dallas Frasca
Mason Rack Band
Lachlan Bryan
Marshall O'Kell
Claude Hay
Ashleigh Mannix
Round Mountain Girls
Ollie Brown
Mojo Bluesman
Kooii
Harry Healy
Blackbirds
Mick McHugh
Minnie Marks
Young Sounds of Byron

Line-up 2013
The line-up for the 2013 festival included:

Thursday, 28 March
Ben Harper
Trombone Shorty & Orleans Avenue
Frank Turner and The Sleeping Souls
Chris Isaak
Rodriguez
Tedeschi Trucks Band
Joan Armatrading
Fred Wesley and The New JBs
The Duke Robillard Band
Grace Potter
Wanda Jackson
The Snowdroppers
Shawn Colvin
William Elliot Whitmore
Seth Lakeman
The Beards

Friday, 29 March
Santana
Steve Miller Band
Jimmy Cliff
Blind Boys of Alabama
Tedeschi Trucks Band
Joan Armatrading
Rodriguez
Robert Cray
Fred Wesley and The New JBs
Trombone Shorty & Orleans Avenue
Glen Hansard with The Frames
Playing for Change
The Snowdroppers
Michael Kiwanuka
Ruthie Foster
The Haight Ashbury Show
The Beards
The Break
Seth Lakeman
William Elliot Whitmore
Shawn Colvin
Wards Xpress
RocKwiz Live

Saturday 30, March
Robert Plant
Iggy and The Stooges
Wilco
Madness
Grace Potter
Dropkick Murphys
Status Quo
Robert Cray
Blind Boys of Alabama
Allen Toussaint
Beasts of Bourbon
Bettye LaVette
Playing for Change 
The Beards
Saskwatch
Ruthie Foster
Michael Kiwanuka
Sweet Honey in the Rock
Seth Lakeman
Ben Caplan
The Haight Ashbury Show
Hat Fitz & Cara
Round Mountain Girl
Wards Zpress
Lil Fi & The Rascals
RocKwiz Live

Sunday, 31 March
The Cat Empire
Fat Freddy's Drop
Madness
Roger Hodgson
Xavier Rudd
Jon Anderson
Mavis Staples
Karise Eden
Wanda Jackson
Bettye LaVette
Allen Toussaint
Tony Joe White
Melbourne Ska Orchestra
The Bamboos
Sweet Honey in the Rock
Saskwatch
Playing for Change
Luka Bloom
King Cannons
Ben Caplan
Mason Rack Band
The Haight Ashbury Show
RocKwiz Live

Monday, 1 April
Paul Simon
Wilco
Rufus Wainwright
Xavier Rudd
Bonnie Raitt
Melbourne Ska Orchestra
Fat Freddy's Drop
Mavis Staples
The Bamboos
Grey Ghost 
King Cannons
Bettye LaVette
Newton Faulkner
Tony Joe White
Busby Marou
The Beards
Haight Ashbury Show
Ben Caplan
Hat Fitz & Cara
The Wilson Pickers

Line-up 2014
The line-up for the 2014 festival included:

Thursday, 17 April
 John Mayer  
 Edward Sharpe & the Magnetic Zeros  
 Grace Potter and the Nocturnals  
 Beth Hart  
 Arakwal Opening Ceremony
 Zane Carney 
 Buddy Guy  
 Dr John & the Nite Trippers 
 The Charlie Musselwhite Band 
 The Black Sorrows  
 Tijuana Cartel
 Seun Kuti & Egypt 80  
 Public Opinion Afro Orchestra 
 Playing For Change
 Steve Earle & the Dukes
 Dyson, Stringer and Cloher  
 Allen Stone  
 Coronet Blue  
 Suzanne Vega  
 Trixie Whitley  
 Genevieve Chadwick  
 Grandmothers of Invention
 The Magic Band  
 The Soul Rebels  
 Skunkhour  
 Dubmarine
 Garland Jeffreys  
 Glenn Cardier
 Marshall O'Kell and the Pride
 Seth Lakeman  
 Shaun Kirk

Friday, 18 April 
 Jack Johnson 
 Matt Corby 
 Gary Clark Jr 
 India Arie 
 Nahko and Medicine for the People
 Grace Potter and the Nocturnals 
 Tijuana Cartel
 Doobie Brothers 
 Boz Scaggs 
 Buddy Guy 
 Joss Stone 
 Beth Hart 
 Trixie Whitley 
 Dyson, Stringer and Cloher 
 Seun Kuti & Egypt 80 
 Gregg Allman 
 Aaron Neville 
 Eric Bibb 
 Steve Earle & the Dukes 
 RocKwiz 
 Clairy Browne & the Bangin' Rackettes
 Larry Graham & Graham Central Station
 The Wailers 
 The Soul Rebels 
 Public Opinion Afro Orchestra
 The Backsliders 
 The Beards
 The Mastersons
 The Magic Band
 Grandmothers of Invention 
 Allen Stone 
 Dubmarine 
 Coronet Blue 
 Suzanne Vega
 Garland Jeffreys 
 Seth Lakeman 
 The Paladins 
 Nikki Hill
 North Mississippi Allstars 
 The Charlie Musselwhite Band 
 ABC Coast FM National Broadcast
 Music Maker Foundation
 Hat Fitz & Cara
 Daniel Champagne

Saturday, 19 April 
 Dave Matthews Band  
 John Butler Trio  
 Seun Kuti & Egypt 80  
 Iron & Wine  
 Devendra Banhart 
 Kate Miller-Heidke 
 Skunkhour  
 Jeff Beck  
 Gregg Allman  
 Govt Mule  
 Aaron Neville  
 Jimmie Vaughan  
 The James Cotton Blues Band  
 Lime Cordiale
 Morcheeba  
 Larry Graham & Graham Central Station  
 Playing For Change  
 The Black Sorrows  
 The Soul Rebels  
 RocKwiz  
 WAR  
 Ozomatli  
 North Mississippi Allstars  
 Robben Ford  
 Devon Allman  
 KT Tunstall  
 Eugene "Hideaway" Bridges  
 Hat Fitz & Cara  
 Saskwatch  
 Clairy Browne & the Bangin' Rackettes  
 Grandmothers of Invention  
 Nikki Hill  
 The Beards  
 Taste of Boomerang - Glenn Skuthorpe
 Chris Tamwoy, Troy Cassar Daley, Jannawi and ACPA Dancers 
 Terrance Simien - Creole for Kids  
 The Mojo Webb Band  
 Music Maker Foundation  
The Backsliders  
 The Paladins  
 Eric Bibb  
 Glenn Cardier  
 Daniel Champagne  
 Claire Anne Taylor

Sunday, 20 April 
 Erykah Badu  
 Morcheeba  
 Iron & Wine  
 Passenger
 Playing For Change  
 Terrance Simien  
 Foy Vance  
 Kim Churchill  
 Michael Franti & Spearhead  
 Ozomatli  
 Nahko and Medicine for the People
 Chali 2na  
 WAR  
 Cambodian Space Project  
 CW Stoneking  
 Hat Fitz & Cara  
 Govt Mule  
 Sly & Robbie and the Taxi Gang 
 Mystery Performance - Watch This Space  
 John Williamson  
 Kasey Chambers  
 RocKwiz  
 Jimmie Vaughan  
 Robben Ford  
 The James Cotton Blues Band  
 Booker T Jones  
 Tim Rogers  
 Valerie June  
 Matthew Curry 
 Music Maker Foundation  
 The Magic Band  
 Saidah Baba Talibah 
 Watussi
 Taste of Boomerang - Glenn Skuthorpe 
 Chris Tamwoy, Troy Cassar Daley, Jannawi and ACPA Dancers 
 KT Tunstall 
 The Beards 
 Chain  
 Eugene "Hideaway" Bridges  
 Devon Allman  
 Ray Beadle
 Joanne Shaw Taylor  
 Candye Kane Band
 Nikki Hill  
 Claude Hay

Monday, 21 April 
 Dave Matthews Band  
 Michael Franti & Spearhead  
 Joss Stone  
 India Arie  
 Devendra Banhart  
 Kim Churchill  
 Elvis Costello & The Imposters  
 Jake Bugg  
 Foy Vance  
 KC & The Sunshine Band  
 WAR  
 Shaun Kirk 
 Gary Clark Jr  
 Booker T Jones  
 Sly & Robbie and the Taxi Gang  
 Ozomatli 
 Chali 2na  
 Matthew Curry  
 Lime Cordiale 
 Watussi  
 Saskwatch  
 Jason Isbell  
 Cambodian Space Project  
 Terrance Simien  
 Saidah Baba Talibah  
 Round Mountain Girls
 2014 Busking Winner  
 Playing For Change  
 The Beards 
 Chain  
 Music Maker Foundation  
 Tim Rogers  
 Candye Kane Band  
 Byron Area High Schools Showcase  
 Ray Beadle
 The Mojo Webb Band  
 Joanne Shaw Taylor  
 CW Stoneking  
 Valerie June  
 Claude Hay  
 Phil Manning  
 Genevieve Chadwick

Line-up 2015
The line-up for the 2015 festival included:

Thursday, 2 April 
 Counting Crows
 Trombone Shorty & Orleans Avenue
 Sticky Fingers
 Jurassic 5
 Declan Kelly presents Diesel N' Dub feat. Frank Yamma, Emma Donovan, Radical Son, Pat Powell & Tony Hughes
 Frank Yamma
 Arakwal Opening Ceremony
 Angus & Julia Stone
 Hozier
 Boy & Bear
 Augie March
 Justin Townes Earle
 Skipping Girl Vinegar
 Jimmy Cliff
 SOJA
 Playing for Change
 Chris Robinson Brotherhood
 Wagons
 Luluc
 Nikki Hill
 Keb' Mo'
 G.Love & Special Sauce
 Matt Andersen
 Shaun Kirk
 Kristy Lee
 The Rumjacks
 Delta Rae
 Music Makers Blues Revue
 Dewayne Everettsmith
 The Bella Reunion

Friday, 3 April
 Alabama Shakes
 Paolo Nutini
 British India
 Trombone Shorty & Orleans Avenue
 Beth Hart
 Band Of Skulls
 Switchfoot
 Delta Rae
 Zac Brown Band
 Hunter Hayes
 Train
 Jimmy Cliff
 SOJA
 Keb' Mo'
 Nikki Hill
 Gary Clark Jr.
 Chris Robinson Brotherhood
 Ruthie Foster
 G. Love & Special Sauce
 JJ Grey & Mofro
 RocKwiz
 Dispatch
 Donavon Frankenreiter
 Playing for Change
 Declan Kelly presents Diesel N' Dub feat. Frank Yamma, Emma Donovan, Radical Son, Pat Powell & Tony Hughes
 The Beat  
 Keziah Jones
 Jake Shimabukuro
 Kristy Lee
 Music Maker Blues Revue
 Jeff Lang
 Matt Andersen
 ABC Gold Coast FM National Broadcast
 Dewayne Everettsmith
 Frank Yamma
 Shaun Kirk

Saturday, 4 April
 Paolo Nutini
 Alabama Shakes
 Hozier
 Melbourne Ska Orchestra
 Mariachi El Bronx
 Skipping Girl Vinegar
 Band Of Skulls
 Genevieve Chadwick & The Stones Throw
 David Gray
 The Gipsy Kings
 Rodrigo y Gabriela
 The Waterboys
 John Mayall
 Nikki Hill
 Steve Smyth
 Playing for Change
 Fly My Pretties
 Dispatch
 Donavon Frankenreiter
 Keziah Jones
 RocKwiz
 Jon Cleary & The Monster Gentlemen
 Pokey LaFarge
 Dave Alvin & Phil Alvin with The Guilty Ones
 Jeff Lang
 Rebelution
 The Beat
 Kristy Lee
 Marlon Williams & The Yarra Benders
 Music Maker Blues Revue
 The Rumjacks
 Watussi
 Wagons
 Karl S. Williams
 Jake Shimabukuro
 Luluc

Sunday, 5 April
 Ben Harper & The Innocent Criminals
 Rodrigo y Gabriela
 Xavier Rudd & The United Nations
 Hunter Hayes
 Beth Hart
 The Beautiful Girls
 JJ Grey & Mofro
 Jurassic 5
 Frank Turner & The Sleeping Souls
 Melbourne Ska Orchestra
 Angelique Kidjo
 Gary Clark Jr.
 Ash Grunwald
 Declan Kelly presents Diesel N' Dub feat. Frank Yamma, Emma Donovan, Radical Son, Pat Powell & Tony Hughes 
 Skipping Girl Vinegar
 Charles Bradley & His Extraordinaires
 Blue King Brown
 Fly My Pretties
 Mavis Staples
 Ruthie Foster
 RocKwiz
 The Rumjacks
 Jon Cleary & The Monster Gentlemen
 Nikki Hill
 Diesel
 Justin Townes Earle
 Phil Wiggins & Dom Turner
 Matt Andersen
 Steve Smyth
 Playing for Change
 Music Maker Blues Revenue
 Watussi
 Karl S. Williams
 James T.
 Serena Ryder
 Genevieve Chadwick & The Stones Throw
 Eddie Boyd & The Phatapillars (2014 Busking Comp Winner)

Monday, 6 April
George Clinton & Parliament Funkadelic
Paul Kelly presents Merri Soul Sessions feat. Dan Sultan, Kira Puru, Vika & Linda Bull, Clairy Browne
Charles Bradley & His Extraordinaires
Angelique Kidjo
Watussi
Nikki Hill
Michael Franti & Spearhead
SOJA
Rebelution
Michael Franti's Soulshine - Yoga & Acoustic Jam
Mariachi El Bronx
The Beautiful Girls
Gary Clark Jr.
Mavis Staples
John Mayall
Dave Alvin & Phil Alvin with The Guilty Ones
Ash Grunwald
Pokey LaFarge
Karl S. Williams
Playing for Change
Blue King Brown
Declan Kelly presents Diesel N' Dub feat. Frank Yamma, Emma Donovan, Radical Son, Pat Powell & Tony Hughes  
Tony Joe White
Diesel
Serena Ryder
Steve Smyth
2015 Busking Competition Winner
Music Maker Blues Revue
Phil Wiggins & Dom Turner
Matt Andersen
James T.
The Bella Reunion
Eddie Boyd & The Phatapillars (2014 Busking Comp Winners)
Marlon Williams & The Yarra Benders

Line-up 2016
The line-up for the 2016 festival included:

Thursday, 24 March 
Kendrick Lamar 
D'Angelo 
Kamasi Washington
Hiatus Kaiyote 
Fantastic Negrito
Welcome to Country 
Tedeschi Trucks Band 
Cold War Kids 
Tweedy 
Con Brio 
Harts                       
The Wailers present Exodus 
The Word 
Janiva Magness 
Lukas Nelson & Promise of the Real
The Bros. Landreth 
Songhoy Blues 
Rhiannon Giddens 
Emma Donovan & The Putbacks 
Kaleo 
Lord Huron 
Digging Roots 
Lucky Peterson 
Eugene 'Hideaway' Bridges
Chain 
Steve Smyth 
Blind Boy Paxton  
Marshall Okell

Friday, 25 March
The National
City and Colour
Nahko and Medicine For The People
Grace Potter 
Elle King 
Lord Huron 
Kaleo
The Mick Fleetwood Blues Band featuring Rick Vito
St. Paul & The Broken Bones 
Tweedy 
Graham Nash 
Archie Roach 
East Journey 
Arakwal Opening Ceremony 
The Wailers present Uprising
Playing For Change Band
Steve Earle & The Dukes
Blackberry Smoke 
The Word 
Songhoy Blues 
Lukas Nelson & Promise of the Real
Tex Perkins & The Ape 
Con Brio
Rhiannon Giddens 
Shooglenifty 
The Bros. Landreth 
Frazey Ford 
Eugene 'Hideaway' Bridges
Dustin Thomas 
Chain 
Lucky Peterson 
Blind Boy Paxton  
Brotherhood of the Blues
ABC Gold Coast FM National Broadcast
Mojo Juju 
Digging Roots
Hussy Hicks	

Saturday, 26 March 
D'Angelo 
Hiatus Kaiyote 
Kamasi Washington 
The Decemberists 
Eagles of Death Metal 
Con Brio
Harts 
Joe Bonamassa 
Tedeschi Trucks Band 
The Mick Fleetwood Blues Band featuring Rick Vito
Vintage Trouble  
St. Paul & The Broken Bones
Allen Stone 
The Mastersons 
The Wailers present Survival
Nahko and Medicine For The People
Playing For Change Band
Steve Earle & The Dukes
Grace Potter 
Blackberry Smoke 
Janiva Magness 
Emma Donovan & The Putbacks 
The Word 
Lukas Nelson & Promise of the Real
Elle King 
Mike Love 
Fantastic Negrito
Kaleo 
The Bros. Landreth 
Irish Mythen
Lucky Peterson 
Jeff Martin (The Tea Party)
The Residents present Shadowland
Frazey Ford 
Brotherhood of the Blues
Pierce Brothers
Steve Smyth 
Raw Earth
 

Sunday, 27 March 
Noel Gallagher's High Flying Birds
The Decemberists
The Cat Empire 
Modest Mouse 
Blackberry Smoke 
Houndmouth 
Jeff Martin (The Tea Party)
UB40 featuring Ali Campbell, Astro and Mickey Virtue
Melissa Etheridge 
Jackson Browne 
The Blind Boys of Alabama 
Graham Nash 
The Bros. Landreth 
Nathaniel Rateliff & The Night Sweats 
The Selecter 
The Wailers present Legend
Taj Mahal
Shakey Graves 
Ash Grunwald 
Kim Churchill 
Sahara Beck 
Allen Stone 
Janiva Magness 
Fantastic Negrito
Lukas Nelson & Promise of the Real
Shooglenifty 
The Word 
Con Brio
Hussy Hicks
Raw Earth
The Residents present Shadowland 
Mojo Juju
Mike Love 
Blind Boy Paxton  
Wards Xpress
Dustin Thomas 
Grizzlee Train - 2015 Busking Competition Winner

Monday, 28 March 
Tom Jones 
Brian Wilson performing Pet Sounds
The Blind Boys of Alabama 
Russell Morris 
Richard Clapton 
Kim Churchill 
The Original Blues Brothers Band
Joe Bonamassa  
Vintage Trouble  
Playing For Change Band
Taj Mahal 
Irish Mythen
Ash Grunwald 
Pierce Brothers
Jason Isbell 
Shakey Graves 
Nathaniel Rateliff & The Night Sweats 
St. Paul & The Broken Bones
Allen Stone 
Lukas Nelson & Promise of the Real  
Marshall Okell
Tenzin Choegyal
Blackberry Smoke 
Fantastic Negrito 
Backsliders 
Mike Love 
Steve Smyth 
Wards Xpress
2016 Busking Competition Winner 
The Selecter 
Janiva Magness
The Residents present Shadowland
Kaleo 
Shooglenifty 
Blind Boy Paxton  
Sahara Beck 
Local Area High School Showcase

Line-up 2017
The line-up for the 2017 festival included:

Thursday, 13 April
Patti Smith and Her Band perform Horses
Courtney Barnett
Vintage Trouble 
The Strumbellas 
Andrew Bird 
Trevor Hall  
Welcome to Country
Nas with guests The Soul Rebels 
Gallant 
Miles Electric Band
Snarky Puppy
Max Jury 
St. Paul & The Broken Bones 
Trombone Shorty & Orleans Avenue 
Corinne Bailey Rae 
Mavis Staples 
Rhiannon Giddens
Davy Knowles 
The Mountain Goats
Mud Morganfield 
Eric Gales
Nikki Hill
Irish Mythen 
Lucy Gallant
Dumpstaphunk 
The California Honeydrops
The Suffers
Joan Osborne 
Melody Angel
Devon Allman Band 
Blind Boy Paxton

Friday, 14 April
Mary J Blige
Snarky Puppy 
Trombone Shorty & Orleans Avenue
Gallant
Michael Kiwanuka 
Max Jury 
Arakwal Opening Ceremony
The Lumineers 
Bonnie Raitt 
Jimmy Buffett 
Patti Smith acoustic set 
Mavis Staples 
Rhiannon Giddens 
The Mountain Goats 
Playing for Change 
Gregory Porter 
Rickie Lee Jones 
Roy Ayers 
Ellis Hall & Vasti Jackson 
Melody Angel 
Busby Marou 
Dumpstaphunk 
The Suffers 
The Soul Rebels 
Devon Allman Band 
The Strumbellas 
Joan Osborne 
Nikki Hill 
Blind Boy Paxton 
Mud Morganfield 
Eric Gales 
The California Honeydrops 
Davy Knowles 
Wouter Kellerman 
BOOMERANG:
Oka
Jannawi Plus workshop 
Emily Wurramara
Excelsior plus workshop 
Yirrmal
Airileke and Rize Of the Morning Star 
Tenzin Choegyal

Saturday, 15 April
The Doobie Brothers 
Sir Rosevelt
Corinne Bailey Rae 
Gregory Porter 
Ellis Hall & Vasti Jackson 
Max Jury 
St. Paul & The Broken Bones 
Buddy Guy 
Beth Hart 
Vintage Trouble 
Billy Bragg 
Nikki Hill 
Slightly Stoopid 
Nahko & Medicine for the People
The Record Company 
Irish Mythen 
Jake Shimabukuro 
The Australian Ukulele Show
The Wilson Pickers 
Little Georgia 
Devon Allman Band
Roy Ayers
Laura Mvula
Turin Brakes 
Rickie Lee Jones 
Trevor Hall 
Ray Beadle & The Silver Dollars 
Jeff Lang 
The California Honeydrops  
Davy Knowles 
Blind Boy Paxton 
Joan Osborne 
Melody Angel 
BOOMERANG:
Emily Wurramara
Jannawi plus workshop 
Leonard Sumner
Excelsior Plus workshop 
Yirrmal
Jannawi plus workshop

Sunday, 16 April 
Madness 
Michael Kiwanuka 
Slightly Stoopid 
Playing for Change 
Nic Cester and The Milano Elettica
Jake Shimabukuro 
Irish Mythen 
Zac Brown Band 
Santana 
Buddy Guy 
Jethro Tull 
The Record Company 
Round Mountain Girls
Booker T. presents The Stax Revue 
Mavis Staples 
Laura Mvula 
Remi 
The Suffers 
Rhiannon Giddens 
Davy Knowles
Lloyd Spiegel 
Experience Jimi Hendrix
Nikki Hill
Eric Gales 
Turin Brakes 
Devon Allman Band 
Mud Morganfield 
Glenn Cardier and the Sideshow 
Ivy 2016 Busking Competition Winner  
Dumpstaphunk 
The California Honeydrops 
Australian Ukulele Show 
Max Jury 
Wouter Kellerman 
BOOMERANG:
Leonard Sumner 
Excelsior Plus workshop 
Tenzin Choegyal 
Jannawi plus workshop 
Airileke and Rize of the Morning Star 
Excelsior Plus workshop 
Oka

Monday, 17 April 
Zac Brown Band 
Beth Hart 
St. Paul & The Broken Bones 
Miles Electric Band 
The Suffers 
Neil Finn 
Kasey Chambers 
Busby Marou 
Playing for Change 
Nic Cester and The Milano Elettica
Laura Mvula 
Dumpstaphunk 
Mavis Staples 
Booker T presents The Stax Revue 
Billy Bragg & Joe Henry 
Tony Joe White 
Glenn Cardier and the Sideshow
Nahko & Medicine for the People 
The Record Company 
Remi 
Jeff Lang
Lloyd Spiegel
Ray Beadle & The Silver Dollars 
Blind Boy Paxton 
2017 Busking Competition Winner 
The California Honeydrops 
Devon Allman Band 
Melody Angel 
Little Georgia 
Lucy Gallant 
The Wilson Pickers 
Round Mountain Girls 
Local Area High School Showcase

Line-up 2018
The line-up for the 2018 festival included:

Thursday, 29 March
Tash Sultana 
Leon Bridges 
Gomez 
Rag 'n' Bone Man
Holy Holy 
Arakwal Welcome to Country & Opening Ceremony 
The Original Blues Brothers Band 
Jason Isbell and The 400 Unit 
Gov't Mule 
Lukas Nelson & Promise of the Real
Citizen Cope 
The Wailers 
The New Power Generation 
Hurray for the Riff Raff 
All Our Exes Live in Texas 
Elephant Sessions 
Steve Smyth 
Joe Louis Walker
Newton Faulkner 
Ryan McMullan 
Shaun Kirk 
Busking 2018 Finalists 
Dumpstaphunk 
William Crighton
The California Honeydrops 
Caiti Baker
Bali Blues Brothers

Friday, 30 March 
Ms. Lauryn Hill
The New Power Generation 
Gomez 
Asgeir 
Harts 
Clarence Bekker Band
Robert Plant & The Sensational Space Shifters 
Jimmy Cliff
Youssou N’Dour 
Juanes 
All Our Exes Live In Texas
Little Georgia 
The Wailers 
Gov't Mule 
Dumpstaphunk 
Con Brio 
Hanlon Brothers  
The Teskey Brothers  
Citizen Cope  
Eric Gales 
Bobby Rush 
Canned Heat 
Newton Faulkner 
Hurray for the Riff Raff 
André Cymone 
Tay Oskee 2017 Busking Competition Winner 
Molly Millington 2017 Busking Grommet Winner 
The California Honeydrops 
Joe Louis Walker 
Elephant Sessions
Double J Live Broadcast

BOOMERANG:
Narasirato 
The Strides 
Sorong Samarai
Meet the Artists 
Healing Workshops
Weaving workshops 
Art Gallery Talks 
Healing 
Kids weaving 
Weaving with Grasses 
Talks and Ideas 
Move it Mob Style with Darren Compton 
Workshops Jannawi 
Eric Avery 
Muggerah

Saturday, 31 March 
Michael Franti & Spearhead 
The New Power Generation 
Juanes 
Seu Jorge 
Ryan McMullan 
Little Georgia 
The Original Blues Brothers Band - 
Jackson Browne 
Jason Isbell and The 400 Unit 
Leon Bridges 
The Wailers 
Clarence Bekker Band  
Lukas Nelson & Promise of the Real
Dumpstaphunk
Harts 
Con Brio
Harry Manx 
Mia Dyson 
Steve Smyth 
Hussy Hicks 
Afro Celt Sound System 
Canned Heat 
Chain 
André Cymone 
The California Honeydrops 
Citizen Cope 
Busking 2018 Finalists 
Rick Estrin & The Nightcats 
Caiti Baker 
William Crighton 
Shaun Kirk

BOOMERANG:
Sorong Samarai 
Yirrmal 
Benny Walker 
Narasirato 
Meet the Artists
Healing Workshops 
Weaving workshops 
Art Gallery Talks 
Healing 
Kids Weaving 
Weaving with Grasses 
Talks and Ideas 
Narasirato 
Eric Avery 
Move it Mob Style
Jannawi
Workshops Muggerah

Sunday, 1 April 
John Butler Trio 
Tash Sultana 
Ziggy Alberts
First Aid Kit 
José González
The California Honeydrops 
Sheryl Crow 
Melissa Etheridge 
Seal 
Seu Jorge 
Mia Dyson 
Clayton Doley's Bayou Billabong 
Morcheeba 
Rag 'n' Bone Man 
Lukas Nelson & Promise of the Real 
Eric Gales 
Walter Trout 
Afro Celt Sound System 
Dog Trumpet  
Ryan McMullan 
The Wailers 
Dumpstaphunk 
Benjamin Booker 
Hanlon Brothers 
The Teskey Brothers 
Steve Smyth 
William Crighton
2018 Busking Competition Winner 
Bobby Rush 
Caiti Baker 
Clarence Bekker Band 
Hussy Hicks

BOOMERANG:
Yirrmal 
Benny Walker 
The Strides
Meet the Artists 
Healing Workshops 
Weaving workshops 
Art Gallery Talks 
Healing 
Kids weaving 
Weaving with Grasses 
Talks and Ideas
Gathering Ceremony with local dancers
Sarong Samarai
Eric Avery
Move it Mob Style with Darren Compton

Monday, 2 April  
Lionel Richie 
Chic featuring Nile Rodgers 
Dan Sultan  
Benny Walker 
Miss Renee Simone 
Michael Franti & Spearhead 
Jimmy Cliff 
The Wailers 
Con Brio 
Hayley Grace & The Bay Collective 
Morcheeba 
Lukas Nelson & Promise of the Real
Benjamin Booker 
Walter Trout 
Mia Dyson 
Shaun Kirk 
Clayton Doley's Bayou Billabong 
Rick Estrin & The Nightcats 
Eric Gales 
Chain 
Citizen Cope  
Harry Manx 
Steve Smyth 
Caiti Baker 
2018 Busking Grommet Competition Winner 
The California Honeydrops 
Dumpstaphunk 
Clarence Bekker Band 
Dog Trumpet 
William Crighton 
Ryan McMullan 
Bali Blues Brothers 
Local Area High School Showcase

Line-up 2019
The line-up for 2019 included:

Thursday, 18 April
 Mavis Staples
 Snarky Puppy
 Six60
 Kurt Vile and The Violators
 Ocean Alley
 Arlo Guthrie
 Nahko and Medicine for the People
 Ruthie Foster
 Richard Clapton
 Russell Morris
 The Marcus King Band
 Fantastic Negrito
 Samantha Fish
 The War and Treaty
 The Black Sorrows
 Irish Mythen
 Melody Angel
 The California Honeydrops
 Elephant Sessions
 Caiti Baker
 Baker Boy
 Dallas Woods

Friday, 19 April
 Iggy Pop
 Hozier
 Norah Jones
 Tash Sultana
 Gary Clark Jr.
 Snarky Puppy
 Imelda May
 St. Paul and the Broken Bones
 Shakey Graves
 Arlo Guthrie
 Nahko and Medicine for the People
 I'm with Her
 Ruthie Foster
 Flogging Molly
 Backsliders
 The Marcus King Band 
 Samantha Fish
 Deva Mahal
 Pierce Brothers
 Trevor Hall
 Irish Mythen
 Anderson East
 Melody Angel
 Hussy Hicks
 Caiti Baker

BOOMERANG:
 Baker Boy
 Dallas Woods
 DOBBY
 Brotherhood of the Blues

Saturday, 20 April
 Ben Harper
 Kasey Chambers
 Mavis Staples
 Tommy Emmanuel
 Colin Hay
 Imelda May
 Kurt Vile and The Violators 
 Keb' Mo'
 Allen Stone
 St. Paul and the Broken Bones
 Lukas Nelson & Promise of the Real
 Melbourne Ska Orchestra
 I'm with Her
 Flogging Molly
 Fantastic Negrito
 Samantha Fish
 The War and Treaty
 Larkin Poe
 Yothu Yindi and The Treaty Project
 Vintage Trouble
 Melody Angel
 The California Honeydrops 
 Elephant Sessions
 Caiti Baker
 Little Georgia
 Dallas Woods
 Amaru Tribe
 RocKwiz Live

BOOMERANG:
 Archie Roach
 Mojo Juju
 Benny Walker
 DOBBY

Sunday, 21 April
 Jack Johnson
 Nathaniel Rateliff & The Night Sweats
 Mavis Staples
 Gary Clark Jr.
 George Clinton & Parliament-Funkadelic
 Meshell Ndegeocello
 Lukas Nelson & Promise of the Real
 Melbourne Ska Orchestra
 Archie Roach
 Shakey Graves
 Ruthie Foster
 Tex Perkins and The Fat Rubber Band 
 Backsliders
 The Marcus King Band 
 Fantastic Negrito
 The War and Treaty
 Deva Mahal
 Larkin Poe
 Pierce Brothers
 Trevor Hall
 Anderson East
 Melody Angel
 Thando Sikwila
 The California Honeydrops
 Little Georgia
 RocKwiz Live

BOOMERANG:
 Yothu Yindi and The Treaty Project
 Mission Songs Project
 Benny Walker

Monday, 22 April
 Paul Kelly
 The Saboteurs
 David Gray
 Ray LaMontagne
 Julia Stone
 Nathaniel Rateliff & The Night Sweats
 George Clinton & Parliament-Funkadelic 
 Keb' Mo'
 Allen Stone
 St. Paul and the Broken Bones
 Lukas Nelson & Promise of the Real
 Archie Roach
 I'm with Her
 Samantha Fish
 Deva Mahal
 Vintage Trouble
 Mojo Juju
 Anderson East
 Melody Angel
 Hussy Hicks
 Thando
 The California Honeydrops 
 Elephant Sessions
 Caiti Baker 
 Mission Songs Project
 Benny Walker
 Amaru Tribe
 Brotherhood of the Blues

Line-up 2020
Bluesfest 2020 was cancelled on 16 March 2020 due to the Public Health COVID-19 Public Events Order 2020.

The line-up for 2020 was set to include:

Thursday, 9 April
The Cat Empire
Frank Turner
Zucchero
The Sensations 
Ash Grunwald  
Trombone Shorty & Orleans Avenue
LP  
The Bamboos 
The Regime 
Tal Wilkenfeld
Jimmie Vaughan 
Greensky Bluegrass
Steve 'n' Seagulls
The War & Treaty
Yola
Hussy Hicks
The Allman Betts Band
Christone "Kingfish" Ingram 
Amadou & Mariam 
Micki Free 
Erja Lyytinen 
MY BABY
Pacey, King & Doley
Here Come the Mummies 
Round Mountain Girls
Roshani
LamBros.

Friday, 10 April
Lenny Kravitz
Dweezil Zappa
Cory Henry & the Funk Apostles
LP 
The Bamboos 
The Sensations 
Alanis Morissette 
Brandi Carlile 
Buffy Sainte-Marie
Yola 
The Waifs
The War and Treaty
Morcheeba 
The Marcus King Band 
Zucchero 
Steve 'n' Seagulls
Amadou & Mariam
The Regime 
Jimmie Vaughan 
The Allman Betts Band
Greensky Bluegrass 
Christone "Kingfish" Ingram  
Ash Grunwald 
Morgane Ji
MY BABY
Here Come the Mummies 
Erja Lyytinen 
Tal Wilkenfeld 

Saturday, 11 April
Kool and the Gang 
George Benson 
The Gipsy Kings 
Zucchero 
Dirty Honey 
Harts Plays Hendrix
Patti Smith and Her Band 
Ani DiFranco 
Allen Stone 
Troy Cassar-Daley 
Larkin Poe 
Australian Americana Music Honours
Eagles of Death Metal 
Morcheeba 
Cory Henry & the Funk Apostles 
Amadou & Mariam 
Tal Wilkenfield 
Joachim Cooder 
Hussy Hicks 
MY BABY 
Walter Trout 
Chain
Pacey, King & Doley 
Micki Free 
Erja Lyytinen 
Steve 'n' Seagulls 
Here Come the Mummies 
The War & Treaty 
The Allman Betts Band 
Morgane Ji 
ABC Broadcast 
Roshani 
Emily Wurramara 
LamBros.

Sunday, 12 April
The Wailers 
Allen Stone 
Guy Sebastian 
Tori Kelly 
Dami Im 
Yola 
Little Georgia
Crowded House 
Xavier Rudd 
John Butler  
Ani DiFranco
The Waifs
Henry Wagons 
Jimmie Vaughan
The Marcus King Band
The Waterboys 
Buffy Sainte-Marie
Daniel Champagne
Joachim Cooder 
The Allman Betts Band 
The Sensations 
John Mayall 
Greensky Bluegrass 
Steve 'n' Seagulls 
Troy Cassar-Daley (Trio) 
Dirty Honey
Roshani 
Electrik Lemonade 
Christone "Kingfish" Ingram 
The War & Treaty  
Ray Beadle (acoustic) 
Morgane Ji 
Emily Wurramara 
Nathan Cavaleri 
Hussy Hicks

Monday, 13 April
Patti Smith and Her Band  
Tori Kelly
Larkin Poe 
The War & Treaty 
Hussy Hicks 
Dave Matthews Band  
Christone "Kingfish" Ingram 
The Waterboys 
The Sensations 
Round Mountain Girls 
Cory Henry & the Funk Apostles 
John Mayall 
Walter Trout
Micki Free 
Harts Plays Hendrix 
The Allman Betts Band 
Here Come the Mummies 
Chain
Tal Wilkenfield 
Joachim Cooder 
Henry Wagons 
Nathan Cavaleri 
Palm Valley 
Pacey, King & Doley 
Ray Beadle (acoustic) 
The Regime 
Daniel Champagne 
Little Georgia
Local Area High School Showcase

Line-up 2021
Bluesfest 2021 was cancelled on 31 March 2021 by order of the Minister for Health and Medical Research, due to the discovery of a positive COVID-19 case in Byron Bay the previous day.

The line-up for 2021 was set to include:

Thursday, 1 April
 Welcome to Country
 Bluesfest Busking 2021 Finalists
 Fiona Boyes
 JK-47
 Lambros.
 Ash Grunwald
 Garrett Kato
 Roshani
 Backsliders
 Kim Churchill
 Hussy Hicks
 The Black Sorrows
 The Bamboos
 Pacey, King & Doley
 Ross Wilson and the Peaceniks
 Hiatus Kaiyote
 The Regime
 Melbourne Ska Orchestra
 The Cat Empire

Friday, 2 April
 Bluesfest Busking 2021 Finalists
 Roshani
 Nathan Cavaleri
 All Our Exes Live in Texas
 The Buckleys
 Lambros
 Kate Miller-Heidke
 Pierce Brothers
 The Regime
 Vika and Linda
 Kim Churchill
 Fiona Boyes & The Fortune Tellers
 The Waifs
 Harts Plays Hendrix
 The Bamboos
 The Church
 Ash Grunwald
 Russell Morris
 The Angels
 Briggs
 The Black Sorrows
 The Living End
 Ocean Alley

Saturday, 3 April
 Bluesfest Busking 2021 Finalists
 Declan Kelly
 Electrik Lemonade (2019 Busking Competition Winner)
 Lambros.
 Roshani
 Hussy Hicks
 Nathan Cavaleri
 All Our Exes Live in Texas
 Kara Grainger
 Jeff Lang
 Mama Kin Spender
 Harts Plays Hendrix
 Pacey, King & Doley
 Troy Cassar-Daley
 Ziggy Alberts
 Backsliders
 Kev Carmody
 Tash Sultana
 Chain
 Hiatus Kaiyote
 Melbourne Ska Orchestra (with special guests)

Sunday, 4 April
 Little Georgia
 Round Mountain Girls
 Garrett Kato
 Henry Wagons
 Pierce Brothers
 Emily Wurramara
 Daniel Champagne
 The Waifs
 Mama Kin Spender
 Ray Beadle
 Weddings Parties Anything
 Dami Im
 Troy Cassar-Daley
 Xavier Rudd
 Jon Stevens
 Nathan Cavaleri
 John Butler
 Ian Moss
 Hussy Hicks
 Jeff Lang
 The Teskey Brothers
 Jimmy Barnes

Monday, 5 April
 Palm Valley
 Hussy Hicks
 Emily Wurramara
 Roshani
 Daniel Champagne
 Mick Thomas' Roving Commission
 Little Georgia
 Henry Wagons
 Round Mountain Girls
 Tex Perkins The Man in Black
 Kara Grainger
 Ash Grunwald & Josh Teskey
 Kate Ceberano
 Ray Beadle
 Kasey Chambers
 Mark Seymour & The Undertow
 Pacey, King & Doley
 John Williamson
 Chain
 The Regime
 Pete Murray

Bluesfest 2021 was rescheduled to Friday, 1 October 2021 to Monday, 4 October 2021. The revised line-up for 2021 was set to include:

Friday, 1 October
 Midnight Oil
 Ocean Alley
 Xavier Rudd
 The Church
 The Living End
 Russell Morris
 Briggs
 Tex Perkins The Man in Black
 The Black Sorrows
 Ash Grunwald
 Vika and Linda
 Nathan Cavaleri
 Kim Churchill
 JK-47
 Garrett Kato
 Fiona Boyes & The Fortune Tellers
 All Our Exes Live in Texas
 Roshani
 Lambros.
 The Regime
 Bluesfest Busking Competition & Winners
 Welcome to Country

Saturday, 2 April
 Paul Kelly
 Tash Sultana
 Ziggy Alberts
 Kasey Chambers
 The Angels
 Ross Wilson and the Peaceniks
 Kate Miller-Heidke
 The Black Sorrows
 Chain
 Ash Grunwald
 Melbourne Ska Orchestra
 Jeff Lang
 Nathan Cavaleri
 Mama Kin Spender
 Pierce Brothers
 Fiona Boyes & The Fortune Tellers
 Pacey, King & Doley
 All Our Exes Live in Texas
 Hussy Hicks
 Roshani
 Lambros.
 Electrik Lemonade
 Bluesfest Busking Competition & Winners

Sunday, 3 April
 Jimmy Barnes
 John Butler
 The Cat Empire
 The Waifs
 Jon Stevens
 Ian Moss
 Troy Cassar-Daley
 Hiatus Kaiyote
 Weddings Parties Anything
 The Bamboos
 Backsliders
 Jeff Lang
 Nathan Cavaleri
 Kim Churchill
 Henry Wagons
 Garrett Kato
 Mama Kin Spender
 Dami Im
 Pierce Brothers
 Emily Wurramara
 Ray Beadle
 Hussy Hicks
 Daniel Champagne
 Little Georgia
 Round Mountain Girls
 Bluesfest Busking Competition & Winners

Monday, 4 April
 Pete Murray
 Mark Seymour & The Undertow
 Kate Ceberano
 The Waifs
 Troy Cassar-Daley
 Hiatus Kaiyote
 The Bamboos
 Chain
 Melbourne Ska Orchestra
 Mick Thomas' Roving Commission
 Henry Wagons
 Emily Wurramara
 The Buckleys
 Ray Beadle
 Pacey, King & Doley
 Hussy Hicks
 Roshani
 Daniel Champagne
 Little Georgia
 Round Mountain Girls
 The Regime
 Palm Valley
 Bluesfest Busking Competition & Winners

On 17 August 2021, Bluesfest 2021 was once again cancelled due to COVID-19, and will not be rescheduled. The majority of the announced lineup has been confirmed for Bluesfest 2022, which took place over its original Easter weekend scheduling.

Line-up 2022

Thursday, April 14 (Thursdaze)
 The Cat Empire Final Ever Performance of The Original Line-up After 20 Years 
 The Wailers 
 Joe Camilleri Presents The Honeydrippers, Dylan Show
 Christone "Kingfish" Ingram 
 The War and Treaty 
 Tamam Shud
 Spectrum
 60's Psychedelic Liquid Lightshow by Ellis D Fogg
 Spinifex Gum Feat Felix Reibl & Olie McGill from The Cat Empire, Emma Donovan & Marliya Choir
 Zevon-Accidentally Like a Martyr by Henry Wagons
 Kevin Borich Express
 Caravãna Sun
 Tijuana Cartel
 Blue Empress All-Stars Feat Fiona Boyes, Cara Robinson, Hussy Hicks, Alison Penney, Kerri Simpson, & Sweet Felicia
 Minnie Marks
 Juzzie Smith
 Welcome to Country

Friday, April 15
 Midnight Oil
 Six60 
 L.A.B.
 The Living End
 Hoodoo Gurus
 The Angels
 the Man In Black
 The Church
 Morcheeba 
 The Marcus King Band 
 Casey Barnes
 The Black Sorrows
 Vika & Linda
 Russell Morris
 Baker Boy
 All Our Exes Live in Texas
 Briggs
 Amadou & Mariam 
 C.W. Stoneking
 Kevin Borich Express
 Blue Empress All-Stars Feat Fiona Boyes, Cara Robinson, Hussy Hicks, Alison Penney, Kerri Simpson, & Sweet Felicia
 19-Twenty
 Ash Grunwald
 Fiona Boyes & the Fortune Tellers
 Lachy Doley & the Horns of Conviction
 Kara Grainger
 Nathan Cavaleri
 Kim Churchill
 JK-47
 The Regime
 Garrett Kato
 ROSHANI
 Hat Fitz & Cara
 Round Mountain Girls
 Lambros.
 Bluesfest Busking Competition & Winners

Saturday, April 16
 Paul Kelly
 Amy Shark
 The Wailers 
 Xavier Rudd 
 Missy Higgins
 Kasey Chambers
 Ross Wilson & the Peaceniks
 Kate Miller-Heidke
 Morcheeba 
 Casey Barnes
 The Black Sorrows
 Christone "Kingfish" Ingram 
 The War and Treaty 
 Cory Henry 
 Chain
 Stan Walker 
 All Our Exes Live in Texas
 C.W. Stoneking
 Melbourne Ska Orchestra
 19-Twenty
 Ash Grunwald
 Plays the Songs of Led Zeppelin
 Fiona Boyes & the Fortune Tellers
 Lachy Doley & the Horns of Conviction
 Kara Grainger
 Ray Beadle
 Lisa Hunt's Forever Soul
 Pacey, King & Doley
 Nathan Cavaleri
 Mama Kin Spender
 Geoff Achison & the Soul Diggers
 Garrett Kato
 Hussy Hicks
 ROSHANI
 Hat Fitz & Cara
 Lambros.
 Electrik Lemonade
 Bluesfest Busking Competition & Winners

Sunday, April 17
 Jimmy Barnes
 Crowded House
 George Benson 
 Fat Freddys Drop
 John Butler
 The Wailers 
 Renée Geyer
 Ian Moss
 Jon Stevens
 The Waifs
 Hiatus Kaiyote
 Weddings, Parties, Anything
 The Marcus King Band 
 Cory Henry 
 Diesel
 Troy Cassar-Daley
 Amadou & Mariam 
 The War and Treaty
 Josh Teskey & Ash Grunwald
 Christone "Kingfish" Ingram 
 The Bamboos
 Backsliders
 Melbourne Ska Orchestra
 19-Twenty
 Henry Wagons 
 Jeff Lang
 Ray Beadle
 Nathan Cavaleri
 Kim Churchill
 Fools
 Mama Kin Spender
 Dami Im
 Pierce Brothers
 Emily Wurramara
 Daniel Champagne
 Hussy Hicks
 Little Georgia
 Round Mountain Girls
 Rockwiz Live!

Monday, 18 April
 The Teskey Brothers
 The Wailers 
 Kate Ceberano
 Pete Murray
 The Waifs
 John Williamson
 Hiatus Kaiyote
 Mark Seymour & The Undertow
 Troy Cassar-Daley
 Amadou & Mariam 
 Christone "Kingfish" Ingram 
 The War and Treaty 
 Cory Henry 
 Chain
 Josh Teskey & Ash Grunwald
 The Bamboos
 Sam Teskey
 Plays the Songs of Led Zeppelin
 Henry Wagons
 Jeff Lang
 Pacey, King & Doley
 Fools
 Emily Wurramara
 The Buckleys
 Mick Thomas's Roving Commission
 Geoff Achison & the Soul Diggers
 Daniel Champagne
 Minnie Marks
 The Regime
 Hussy Hicks
 ROSHANI
 Juzzie Smith
 Little Georgia
 Palm Valley
 Rockwiz Live!

Line-up 2023 
The 2023 Byron Bay Bluesfest is set to run from the 6th to the 10th of April and the line-up will include the following artists.

 Gang of Youths
 Paolo Nutini
 Tash Sultana
 Bonnie Raitt
 The Doobie Brothers
 Buddy Guy
 Joe Bonamassa
 Jackson Browne
 Elvis Costello & The Imposters
 Jason Isbell
 Lucinda Williams
 Counting Crows
 Beck
 Mavis Staples
 Nathaniel Rateliff & The Night Sweats
 Michael Franti & Spearhead
 Robert Glasper
 Trombone Shorty & Orleans Avenue
 LP
 The Cat Empire
 Xavier Rudd
 Kaleo
 Yirrmal
 Beth Hart
 Marcus King
 Eric Gales
 Steve Earle
 St Paul & The Broken Bones
 Lisa Hunt
 Larkin Poe
 Keb' Mo' Band
 Allison Russell
 Chain
 The Black Sorrows
 The Angels
 Spinifex Gum
 Fem Kuti & The Positive Force
 Dami Im
 Jon Stevens
 Christone Ingram
 Vintage Trouble
 Backsliders
 Ray Beadle Stax of Blues
 Ash Grunwald
 Clarence Bekker Band

See also
List of festivals in Australia
List of reggae festivals
List of blues festivals
West Coast Blues & Roots Festival

References

External links

Bluesfest Byron Bay
Bluesfest Touring
News from local residents on the new festival site

Blues festivals in Australia
1990 establishments in Australia
Byron Bay, New South Wales
Reggae festivals
Music festivals established in 1990
Festivals in New South Wales
Recurring events established in 1990
Festivals cancelled due to the COVID-19 pandemic